Joonas Järvinen (born 5 January 1989) is a Finnish professional ice hockey player. He is currently playing with Düsseldorfer EG in the Deutsche Eishockey Liga (DEL).

Playing career
He began his professional career playing in the Finnish SM-liiga with TPS and Lahti Pelicans. On 30 May 2012, he signed a two-year, two-way contract as an unrestricted free agent with Nashville Predators and played the 2012–13 season in the American Hockey League with the Milwaukee Admirals.

After a second successive season with the Admirals,  Järvinen left the Predators organization and signed as a free agent on a one-year deal with Russian club, HC Sochi in the KHL.

References

External links

1989 births
Living people
Ässät players
Düsseldorfer EG players
Finnish expatriate ice hockey players in China
Finnish expatriate ice hockey players in Russia
Finnish expatriate ice hockey players in the United States
Finnish ice hockey defencemen
HIFK (ice hockey) players
Jokerit players
HC Kunlun Red Star players
Milwaukee Admirals players
Lahti Pelicans players
HC Sochi players
Tappara players
HC TPS players
Sportspeople from Turku